Ammer Polisa is an Indian Tulu-language comedy-drama film, directed by K. Sooraj Shetty and released in 2018. Roopesh Shetty and actress Pooja Shetty are the main lead. The film released on 22 June, 2018.

Cast 
Roopesh Shetty 
Pooja Shetty 
Rajesh B. Shetty
Aravind Bolar as Happy
Sathish Bandale
Prasanna Shetty
Sandeep Shetty
Deepak Paladka 
Deepak Rai 
Vismaya Vinayak as Sharapadipa Sarpe
Mime Ramdas
Mimicry Sharan

Pruthvi Ambaar, Sooraj Shetty, and Naveen D. Padil make a guest appearance at the end of the film.

Soundtrack 
The soundtrack album features one song composed by Sandeep R Ballal and written by Arjun Lewis.

Reception 
A critic from Tulu Cinema called the film "a great comedy entertainer".

References

2018 films